Gigi Edgley (born 16 November 1977) is an Australian actress, singer and songwriter. She is best known for her roles as Chiana on the series Farscape and Lara Knight in Rescue: Special Ops.

Early life
Edgley was born in Perth. She is the daughter of theatre, concert and circus promoter Michael Edgley, known for bringing the Moscow State Circus to Australia during the 1980s. Her mother, Jeni Edgley, was formerly involved in managing a 250-acre (101 hectare) health retreat. As a child, Gigi Edgley performed both in and out of school. She also took several years of ballet, jazz, and character dance. She became mainly interested in acting and had her first professional theatrical engagement at the Twelfth Night Theatre. She earned a Bachelor of Arts degree from the Queensland University of Technology in 1998. As a believer in the school of method acting, Gigi has developed a broad set of skills and experiences for her roles. Edgley is proficient in ballet, jazz, character dance, singing, and martial arts. Her signature skill is fire-twirling.

Career

Acting
Edgley's early TV and film work included several independent productions (with later Farscape co-star Anthony Simcoe), as well as a guest star spot on the popular Australian series Water Rats and a role in Australian film titled The Day of the Roses.

Edgley is best known for her role as Chiana on the science fiction TV series Farscape. Originally, she was hired for only one episode, and her character was supposed to die at the end of the hour. The creators decided to keep her around for a few more episodes. At the beginning of Season 2, she was promoted to be a regular on the show. She appeared in total of 68 episodes of the series. Her character's nickname (Pip) was actually coined by her co-star Ben Browder.

Between seasons, Edgley has appeared in other guest starring roles on TV, including the popular internationally aired series The Lost World and BeastMaster (returning for a second guest starring role), has undertaken some independent film work, was cast in a feature film (pulled due to production and schedule reasons), and read a starring role in an audio drama for Seeing Ear Theatre.

After Farscape, Edgley pursued other projects including a role in the Australian drama telefilm BlackJack with Colin Friels. She joined the cast of Australian drama series The Secret Life of Us in 2003 and Stingers in 2004.

Edgley returned as Chiana in the SciFi Channel miniseries Farscape: The Peacekeeper Wars in 2004.

In 2006 Edgley starred as the female lead in critically acclaimed Australian Drama/Thriller Last Train to Freo. Her role was nominated for a Best Actress in a Lead Role by the Film Critics Circle of Australia. She also had a minor supporting role in the 2007 USA Network TV miniseries The Starter Wife. She had a leading role in three seasons of Rescue: Special Ops from 2009. In 2018, she appeared in the film Diminuendo opposite Richard Hatch.

She frequently appears at science fiction conventions and gives interviews to many magazines and radio stations around the world.

Music
Edgley recorded a music single titled "Poison" with recording artist n8. The song is available as streaming audio on her webpage in the music section. She also appeared in a music video for the song "When You Get to California" (2004) by Australian rock group Hoodoo Gurus.

In July 2007, Edgley began recording with Seattle-based artist/producer Kyle Stevens and writing songs for a new music release.  At Farscape Con in November 2007, Gigi released "...SO IT SEEMS", a five song E.P. produced and co-written with Kyle. Edgley has recorded Fall, Ftang!, and Blue Sky Thoughts.

Other appearances and achievements
Edgley was featured in several printed magazines. Most notably, she appeared nude in the Issue 49 (February 2001) of the popular Australian magazine Black+White. She was also on the cover of the FHM magazine in December 2003 and the cover of the US version of the TV Guide (29 July – 4 August 2000 issue).

Edgley was Yen Magazine's ambassador for the 2006 Pantene Young Woman of the Year Awards.

Filmography

Film

Television

Music credits
 Vocal work on a single Poison by N8
 Starred in a video for When You Get To California by Hoodoo Gurus

Awards
 2006 – Film Critics Circle of Australia Award Nomination for Best Actress in a motion picture (Last Train to Freo)
 2003 – SyFy Genre Award for Best Supporting Actress (Television)
 2002 – Saturn Award Nomination for Best Supporting Actress in a Television Series (Farscape)
 2001 – Maxim Award Nomination for Sexiest Space Babe (Television)

References

External links

 
 

1977 births
Living people
Australian television actresses
Queensland University of Technology alumni
21st-century Australian singers
21st-century Australian women singers